William Howard Sumrall (December 4, 1916 – October 29, 1964), alternately spelled "Summerall" and nicknamed "Big Train", was an American Negro league pitcher between 1938 and 1940.

A native of Deering, Missouri, Sumrall played for the New York Black Yankees in 1938, and went on to play for the Memphis Red Sox in 1940. Sumrall died in Gary, Indiana in 1964 at age 47.

References

External links
 and Seamheads 
 William Sumrall at Arkansas Baseball Encyclopedia

1916 births
1964 deaths
Memphis Red Sox players
New York Black Yankees players
Baseball pitchers
Baseball players from Missouri
People from Pemiscot County, Missouri
20th-century African-American sportspeople